Gentofte Lake (Danish: Gentofte Sø) is a lake in Gentofte in the northern suburbs of Copenhagen, Denmark. It has a surface area of 36.73 hectares. The Brobæk Mose bogland adjoins the lake to the northwest.

History

The original Gentofte was situated at the lake. Alexander Mitchell, a Scottish immigrant, established a hosiery factory at the lake in 1795. The lake was used in Copenhagen's water supply until 1959.

The site
The neighbourhood at Mitchellsstræde is the remains of the so-called Bondeby. The oldest of the houses is from 1728. The yellow buildings located closest to the lake are the remains of Mitchell's stockings factory.

References

Rxternal links
 Source

Parks and open spaces in Gentofte Municipality
Geography of Copenhagen
Lakes of Zealand